Tujan in Iran may refer to:
 Tujan, Alborz (توجان - Tūjān)
 Tujan, Hormozgan (توجن - Tūjan)
 Tujan, Kerman (طوجان - Ţūjān)
 Tujan, Qasr-e Qand (توجان - Tūjān), Sistan and Baluchestan Province